William Ho Ka-kui (March 14, 1948 – January 27, 2015) was a Hong Kong Chinese actor in the 1970s. He was born in Kowloon City, Hong Kong. Ho acted as a warden named Sugiyama in the movie, Riki-Oh: The Story of Ricky, which starred Louis Fan as Riki Oh Saiga. Ho acted in 139 movies from 1976 to 2015. On January 27, 2015, he died in the Hong Kong Health Center of organ failure.

Early life 
Ho was born in Kowloon City, Hong Kong, on March 14, 1948. He spent his early life in Kowloon and then his parents sent him to Shanghai, where he began acting with the film company Bang! Bang! Films.

References

External links 

20th-century Hong Kong male actors
2015 deaths
21st-century Hong Kong male actors
Hong Kong male film actors
1948 births
People from Kowloon
Deaths from multiple organ failure